Private Louis Jordan Bruner (October 6, 1834 – January 28, 1912) was an American soldier who fought in the American Civil War. Bruner received the country's highest award for bravery during combat, the Medal of Honor, for his action at Walkers Ford in Tennessee on December 2, 1863. He was honored with the award on March 9, 1896.

Biography
Bruner was born in Monroe County, Indiana, on October 6, 1834, and enlisted in 5th Indiana Volunteer Cavalry at Clifty Brumer, Indiana. He died on January 28, 1912, and his remains are interred at the Green Park Cemetery in Indiana.

Medal of Honor citation

See also

List of American Civil War Medal of Honor recipients: A–F

References

1834 births
1912 deaths
People of Indiana in the American Civil War
Union Army officers
United States Army Medal of Honor recipients
American Civil War recipients of the Medal of Honor